The Maruhage Empire (マルハーゲ帝国 Maruhage Teikoku) is a fictional kingdom established on Earth in the year 300X in the manga/anime series Bobobo-bo Bo-bobo by Yoshio Sawai.  Also known as the Margarita Empire (anime) and the Chrome Dome Empire (American dub), it is the primary antagonist as well as the location of most of the actions in the series.

History
The series has not established the length of the existence of the Chromedome Empire, but it is known to have been in existence for at least 200 years, about the period of time for the first four "New Emperor Playoffs" to which an emperor is chosen from the strongest fighters in the world.  The meaning and purpose of the empire prior to one-hundred years before the start of the series is considered a mystery that has yet to be revealed.

One hundred years ago, the Chromedome Empire had entered into its darkest and most destructive period.  The ruler during this period was the infamous Czar Baldy Bald the 3rd, a powerful cybernetic being who desired the destruction of humanity.  Gathering together many of the most powerful warriors on his side, the emperor declared war on humans and used his power to attack and kill as many as possible both in his kingdom and around his world.  Through a great war, the empire grew from a minor power to the most powerful kingdom in the world within four days!  Under his command were twenty-six blocks (each named after a letter of the alphabet, with "A" as the strongest and "Z" as the weakest) and five-million soldiers.  However, there were some kingdoms that did resist the power of the growing empire.  One of his greatest resistance was found from the Hair Kingdom (毛の王国 Ke no Oukoku), a land where warriors powered by the mysterious "Hair Ball" were able to drive away the emperor and his forces.  However, just at the height of their infamy and power, just when the entire world was under their command, all of the powerful warriors, including Czar Baldy Bald the 3rd, entered a cryogenic sleep, never to be reawakened...

With the Third and his forces entering permanent cold sleep, it is unknown who became the next emperor of the Chromedome Empire.  However, the next emperor to take the name of "Czar Baldy Bald" would come close to seventy years after the heyday of the Third Era!  A young boy, born completely bald to the ruler of the Chromedome Empire, became the leader of the land from a very young age, proclaimed even in his youth as Czar Baldy Bald the 4th.  But while the world embraced their new young leader, his prestige would haunt one boy in particular: Hydrate, the new emperor's younger brother!  Because of being born after his brother, Hydrate was forced into being treated like a second-class citizen in his own household.  He attempted to find a way to gain respect from the 4th, attempting to learn the most powerful Shinken from famed teacher Landmine Dandy.  Although he trained and prepared for eight years, this too fell apart: his teacher was taken apart (by his own daughter Torpedo Girl) and he found himself banished into the Dark World (闇の世界 Yami no Sekai) underneath his brother's castle ten years before the start of the story.  Over time, Hydrate would use the power of the Dark World to grow into an empire of his own...

Ten years after being declared emperor (and twenty years prior to the start of the series), Czar Baldy Bald the 4th would make the move that would define his rule.  He declared that all of his subjects, from his soldiers to the common people, were to become bald!  Thus began the great Hair Hunt (毛狩り Kegari), where bald soldiers scoured the cities and the countryside, shaving anyone and everyone they came across to meet with their leader's declaration.

Due to the creation of the Hair Hunt, the 4th chose once again to target the Hair Kingdom, seeing if he could succeed where the previous emperor had failed.  Ambushing their way into the land, the Hair Hunters easily began to overrun the small follicle beings that lived here, chopping off the one strand that they held and subsequently killing them.  However, there were more than merely little hair creatures living in this land: five human-type children, all of whom from the same father Tuyoshi, had been born with the great power of the Hair Kingdom.  Each of these humans was a master of one of the five different kinds of hairs on the body and all held the same "Hair Ball" that would make them future protectors of this land.  As the Maruhage soldiers invaded the country, the five of them were instructed to escape by their father to keep the future of the kingdom alive.  However, only one of them was able to escape: eldest child Bababa-ba Ba-baba, who was accidentally launched into space before the other four were ready to embark.  The second youngest, Bebebe-be Be-bebe, also seemed to mysteriously vanished at this time. (He was later revealed to have been abducted and brainwashed by Hydrate in the midst of the invasion) TUYOSHI's last hope was believed to be in his youngest son: the blond-afroed idiot Bobobo-bo Bo-bobo, who had recently gained the title of the 7th Master of Hanage Shinken (Fist of the Nosehair).  But, in the midst of escape, TUYOSHI chose to steal the escape pod out of the Hair Kingdom, getting out with his life while Bo-bobo was captured and taken to the Maruhage Empire, never to see his home again!  Not too long after Bo-bobo's capture, the invasion of the kingdom was mysteriously called off.  Only two children of the hair remained when it was over: the second-eldest boy Bibibi-bi Bi-bibi (who subsequently took over the leadership of the kingdom for reasons unknown) and middle-child daughter Bububu-bu Bu-bubu.  A sixth Hair Kingdom human, a boy named Hatenko, would also leave the kingdom when the time came both to fight the Hair Hunters and to search for the survivors of this raid. (even if he would soon be distracted by....other things)

In the twenty years since the Hair Kingdom invasion and the present, the Maruhage Empire would continue to consolidate and enforce its power through the land.  Baldy Bald the 4th would continue to rule with ease over his people.  A new generation of Block Leaders, similar to those from the previous era and coming in various styles and abilities (and flavors), would rise to spread fear through the land.  And the people remained under their will as the Hair Hunters continued to shave every person in the empire!  But unlike in previous times, there was finally a resistance against them.  Bobobo-bo Bo-bobo, the child abducted from the Hair Kingdom, would grow to become a formidable warrior that would use his "Fist of the Nosehair" (as well as a bunch of other crazy, wild techniques) to fight against the empire and finally bring an end to centuries of tyranny...

Emperor selection
One of the unique aspects about the determination of leadership in the Maruhage Empire is that there is more than one way for the emperor to be chosen.  These are the various means by which they choose their main leader:
Birth: The easiest way to become an emperor of the Chromedome Empire is to be born to the royal family already in place.  Whoever is the first-born child will become the next in line to becoming the leader after the passing of the former leader.  This is how Czar Baldy-Bald the Fourth became the emperor of the Chromedome Empire, being the first-born son of the family in power and denying the throne to the second-born: Hydrate.
Chromedome Empire New Emperor Playoff: Once every fifty years, the Chromedome Empire holds a tournament of all block leaders and management.  Having to go through various battles and bizarre landscapes to collect enough tokens, the last one standing will become the next Chromedome emperor.  The fifth tournament was unique both in the intervention of forces fighting against the empire (Bo-bobo and his team) as well as the invasion of Hydrate and the Dark Empire, disrupting the battles and forcing enemies to come together to stop him.  However, it is possible that this playoff may have been used by Baldy-Bald the Fourth to eliminate all his enemies, allowing him to continue his leadership.
Aura: Occasionally, there exists a baby born into the empire who exhibits a special aura that is more powerful than the average person.  If one has this aura, then they have the potential to become adopted and put towards the front of the line to become Chromedome Emperor!  By the time of Shinsetsu Bobobo-bo Bo-bobo, one with this empiric aura has been discovered and placed first in line after Baldy-Bald the Third for the throne: schoolboy Yononaka Namerō!

Divisions
In Chapter 1 of the series, an outline is shown revealing the organization of the Chromedome Empire under Czar Baldy Bald the 4th. For some reason though they stand for hunting hair, there are members that are allowed to have hair either a privilege or consists with the random story of the series.
Emperor: The supreme ruler of the Chromedome Empire, this position is the one who controls every other force in the empire.  Whatever he says is law.  In this era, the emperor is Czar Baldy Bald the 4th, most notable for the control of the Hair Hunt to make everyone under his rule bald.
Maruhage Empire Four Heavenly Kings (マルハーゲ四天王 Maruhage Shitenou) / Chrome Dome Empire Big Four: Taking orders directly from Czar Baldy Bald himself, these four are the most powerful Hair Hunters in the empire.  These members rule from specific locations throughout the empire (except Kittypoo, who travels around the world on his own).  While extremely powerful in themselves, each of these four have a vast team of warriors under their command, similar if not more effective than an average Hair Hunter. The loyalty of these four vary from member to member: while powerful and evil members such as Purupuu (Kitty-Poo) and OVER have no mercy in either killing or in ripping hair out and are extremely loyal to the Empire, Halekulani is more concerned with his own profits and in making as much money as possible.  On the other hand, Gunkan (Captain Battleship), while seemingly loyal to the 4th, finds his own ulterior motives in taking out enemies to the empire as well as Hair Hunters!  His motivation: defeat the Hair Hunters, yet at the same time force his rival Bo-bobo to take the blame.
Assassination Corp: On a level similar to the Four Heavenly Kings, these assassins take out the enemies of the empire by any means necessary.  The leader of this squad, Nenchaku, is a merciless killer who is seen by the 4th as one of his most powerful warriors.  It is also believed that teen Hajikelist Rice used to work as an assassin associated with this unit.
Hair Hunt Coordination Headquarters: Very little is known of this division, but it is assumed that this is the leadership controlling the Hair Hunt blocks and coordinating the leaders.  Teru, the most powerful commander of the Hair Hunters, is a member of this division.
Mr. Ooiwa: Little is known who or what this man is, seeing how he never appeared or what connection he has to Tsurulina or the Maruhage Empire.
Hair Hunters Divisions A-G: The seven most powerful Hair Hunt blocks are grouped together and are considered the main leaders of the block-by-block Hair Hunt.  Similar to the seven most powerful Hair Hunters from one-hundred years ago (of whom several block leaders may or may not have a strange coincidence in their selection), the seven most powerful leaders come together to discuss the progress of the Hair Hunt and any problems encountered along the way.  These leaders and blocks are as follows:
A Block: The most powerful of the Hair Hunters, it is led by the gelatinous Tokoroten no Suke (Jelly Jiggler) from an amusement park grown by Bo-bobo out of chopsticks. (originally A-Block had no headquarters and took over the park since Tennosuke thought that would be easier) After he is defeated, Tokoroten eventually joins Bo-bobo's resistance.  Although other versions of "A-Block" are the most powerful (such as in the Former Maruhage and Neo Maruhage), some suspect that Z-Block is really the most powerful of the Maruhage Empire controlled by Tsurulina the Fourth. (being food-based connects him to former leader Hanpen)
B Block: Led by Tsurun, it is destroyed by Gunkan's assistant Suzu during his enigmatic battle against the Empire while employed as a Heavenly King. The former leader of this block was Lambada.
C Block: Ruled from the Aitsuhage Tower headquarters by Geha the Gale, this block also employed the mysterious Babylon servant Softon for a period.  (the wind powers connect Geha to former leader Jeda the Wind God)
D Block: Led by cosplayer Kitemasu, no other information known. The former leader this block was Rem. It seems that they connected because they both like sleeping.
E Block: Led by a hooded man, no other information known. The former leader this block was Combat Blues.
F Block: Led by a hooded man, no other information known. The former leader this block was Ujikin TOKIO.
G Block: Led by the effeminate makeup-wearing Hagen, he would eventually become the first major victim of Bo-bobo's rebellion. (his effeminate nature connects Hagen to former leader Rose-Lily Kikunojō)
Sales Department: Although a government organization, the Hair Hunters are always trying to maintain finances as well as make profits in various business ventures undertaken.  Through various ventures such as the video stores in Aitsuhage Tower, the sale of Hair Hunt apparel (such as uniforms or gear) and even the running and maintenance of two amusement parks (A-Block park, which is later replaced by Neo Hair-Hunt Land MAX, and Hallelujah Land), the government is able to receive needed profits to continue effectively ruling without dissent.
Propaganda Department: Always in need of putting their best face forward to the public, the Hair Hunters effectively use propaganda for both human relations as well as for recruitment.  Appearing in the popular magazines in the empire, they are able to show themselves as a more righteous organization as well as interest though who wish to join their ranks, especially to take down threats such as Bo-bobo.
Public Relations: Certain members of the empire are required to handle the day-to-day relations with the citizens as well as keeping them informed on the latest matters regarding the emperor and the Hair Hunt.  Offices in various cities conduct the interaction between the government and the people, including holding the recruitment of more Hair Hunters and day-to-day paperwork maintenance.  The Maruhage Empire's television channels are also believed to be in this department, with officials in certain blocks creating various content and programming that both entertains and propagates the messages of their emperor.  Characters such as Pagya (recruitment official) and Kuunyan (messenger) are believed to be part of this department.
Hair Hunters Divisions H-Z: The nineteen Hair Hunt blocks below G-Block continue the work of the Hair Hunt in what is considers the weaker sections of the empire.  Although considered not as powerful as the main seven blocks and mostly consistent of ordinary Hair Hunters and their leadership, they continue the hair-based policies on a local level.  Key blocks in this set include:
H Block: Led by Maetel, this team is also known as the Wig Gang for their practice in covering their bald appearance with long-haired wigs.  Their appearance has made enemies with the Hajike Gang based in the area.
M Block: Led by Boss Bob, who was quickly defeated by Hatenko.
L Block: Puppet Lad is a member of this block.
Z Block: A strange enigma within the Hair Hunt organizations, Z Block would normally be considered the weakest of the Hair Hunt blocks due to being at the end of the alphabet.  But in reality, this block is the strongest of all letter-based blocks, partially as a means to eliminate those who wish to start from "the weakest"!  Normal soldiers here are considered equal to the strength (and stupidity) of A-Block leader Tokoro Tennosuke, while the elite warriors are some of the most powerful (and confusing) beings in the Hair Hunt! (such as a TV named Radioman and the game playing vice-leader Kibahage)  At the top of the entire leadership for the block is the tiny white "dog" Dengaku Man, who combines his fierce power with his charm and cuteness.  After the fall of the block, Dengaku Man eventually befriends and joins Bo-bobo.
Other notable divisions
River Block: Also known as "River Block" it is led by Kodebun, a fishing expert.
Robo Block: The guardians of a beach-front property area (the manga has it as a separate block, but the anime makes it the front door of Z Block), this block is made up of four robots working together as a team to take down any invaders and use their teamwork to achieve victory.
Hajike Block: A block formerly closed down by the leader of the Maruhage Empire, it is the legendary block of Hajike warriors.  Great Hajikelists, both working for the empire or fighting against it, search for this block both to fight against other Hajikelists as well as gain some assistance from some of the warriors or items that can be found here.  The leader of this block is Rokka, but he seems rather ineffective compared to the other Hajikelists of the block.  Former assassin Rice lives here after Bo-bobo saves him and even Tennosuke lived here for a short time before joining Bo-bobo's team.

Locations
Inafu Village – Hometown of Beauty and Pickles.
Wigginsville
Demode City
C-Block's Aitsuhage Tower
A Block Amusement Park
Haunted Graveyard
Poo Poo City – Hometown of Gasser and Loincloth Lloyd, until it was destroyed by Capt. Battleship.
Pomade Ring – Capt. Battleship's base.
Iguana Village
House of Blood
Z Block Base
The Beach
Z Block Interior – The true area of Z-Block Base, which was ruled by Dengakuman.
Wiggin Block
Over's Castle
Ruby's Playroom
Waterfall Area: Battle arena for Infinite Shoot, who can change the area into a lava area.
Mesopotamian Guy's Obstacle Course –
Toilet Coliseum
Calamity Canyon – A place where people battle by launching themselves from large cannons located in the canyon. In the air, they try to knock their opponent down to the snappers and traps on the ground. OVER seems to be immune to these.
Holy Guacamole Land – An amusement park run by Halekulani. Bobobo & Don Patch state that Holy Guacamole Land is better than A Block Amusement Park, which they hated.
Be-A-Kid World – A place where anyone who enters, reverts to their kid form. This room is guarded by Nightmare.
Candy House – A house made out of candy. This room is guarded by Garbel of Manicuria
Muscle Marshals Stage
Climb-High Tower – A tall tower surrounded by floating platforms. This area is guarded by the Terrible Triplets.
Money Castle
Cyber City – A vile prison metropolis which is widely surrounded by the ocean. It is surrounded by many surveillance cameras and is ruled by Giga. Cyber City's source of power is the Black Sun; without it, the island would sink.
Libraby Hair-Hunt Stadium – A room full of books. This room is guarded by Bad Bard.
Driving School Stadium – A road with a four-way intersection. This room is guarded by Otto.
Cyber City Control Center
Giga's Lair
Holy Land of Eternal – A shopping mall where Bobobo and everyone else go to become stronger.
Happy Hair-Hunt Land to the MAX – An amusement park that replaced A-Block Amusement Park. It is filled with ninety-nine attractions and the leaders of the Former Maruhage Empire.  Czar Baldy-Bald the Third, plus six out of the seven most powerful leaders, reside here.
Running Wild Gadget – An attraction run by Ujikin TOKIO/Not Nice Cream.
Battlefield Requiem – A rapid-flowing battleground run bu Combat Blues/Major Minor.
Ice Mecha Ring – An ice field run by Jeda.
Hanpen Castle –  An arena made out of a pile of fishcakes. Used by Hanpen/General Lee Fishcake.
Life or Death Triple machine – A giant coin pusher machine arena divided into three separate areas. Each area has a pit lined with giant fans (air fresheners in the dub) that shreds its victims to pieces (or in one case, puts them into a giant bowl of rice... among other weird results). Led by Rem.
Egypt – The place where the Chromedome Empire New Emperor Playoff is held.
Czar Baldy Bald's Castle

Known antagonists
Hajike Gang: A strange squadron first encountered around Hajike Town, it is led by the bizarre leader Don Patch.  While they do not find too much in common with the Maruhage Empire in general, they particularly take offense to the H-Block "Wig Gang".  However, Don Patch does eventually join in the battle against the empire.
Heppokomaru/Gasser]]: A teen boy from Puppu City, he was part of a resistance movement within his hometown against the Maruhage empire, working with his teacher Fundoshitarō (Loincloth Lloyd) to take down local Hair Hunters, particularly Gunkan.  But when his friend is captured and he finds himself on the lam, he wanders across Bo-bobo and Beauty, trying to team up with them while being pursued by assassins sent by Gunkan.  He too eventually joins Bo-bobo's side.
Hatenko: Another citizen of the Hair Kingdom, he left at a young age to search for the missing Bo-bobo due to the problems at home.  Along the way, he takes out any Hair Hunters in the way, but gains bad blood because of such. (in particular with the legendary "Joke Killer" Torpedo Girl, whose alliance is unknown) He also has ties with Don Patch's Hajike Gang.
Giga & the Cyber Empire: Considered an equal to Tsurulina the 4th, Giga leads his own technologically advanced island of Cyber City far away from the jurisdiction of the largest empire. Though occasionally asked for assistance, Giga prefers to keep to his own twisted art, invading other lands only to gather Shinken users to create more of his bizarre masterpieces. The island is penetrated and defeated two times: once by the Hajike rebels to rescue fellow member Heppokomaru, and later by the Neo-Maruhage Blue Elite Corp.
Hydrate & the Reverse Maruhage Empire: Although he is the younger brother of the emperor, Hydrate holds bad blood after being forgotten, abandoned and thrown into the Dark World ten years prior.  Gathering an alliance of several of the most powerful warriors of this world, he has created an empire of his own deep underground, with the primary objective of coming to the surface and claiming a birthright to be the emperor of his brother's kingdom!  Although most of his forces consist of warriors from the Dark World, his alliances also include "Catharsis of Babylon" Byakkō and Hair Child Bebebe-be Be-bebe.
Shigeki X: The original leader of the legendary Shigeki Empire, it has been said he controlled one of the few kingdoms in the entire world that was able to resist the powers of the Maruhage Empire, even drawing infamy from Tsuru Tsurulina the 3rd.  Although the kingdom is no longer in existence, it has been said he may be allied currently with forces in the Hair Kingdom...

Neo-Maruhage Empire
After a series of long, hard and bizarre battles, the Maruhage Empire suddenly was no more.  Baldy-Bald the Fourth went into retirement after abdicating the throne running away from Hydrate (who was defeated by Bo-bobo's team) and the people of the massive nation were finally free.  But the new peace did not last as long as people hoped.  After recharging his power with the assistance of the Hair Ball of Bo-bobo's brother Bibibi-bi Bi-bibi, Czar Baldy Bald the Third, the man responsible for the Maruhage Empire's original power, reclaimed the throne of his former domain.  However, with the Maruhage Empire destroyed, the former Baldy-Bald renamed his new domain the Neo-Maruhage Empire, beginning a new era of tyranny around the land.  Soldiers once again began to shave the head of the people of the land, but further humiliated their victim by gluing a bowl of "Tsurupage Ramen" as a replacement.  Because of this strange new addition to the hair hunts, they were rechristened as the "Kegarimen". (a combination of "hair hunt" and "ramen")

But while the Hair Hunts continued in a similar fashion to both his prior domain and his successor, Baldy-Bald the Third was not merely satisfied with the typical footsoldiers and generals used within the empire.  Seeing the weakness of his former warriors, the emperor and his men began an extensive project to create a new, more powerful generation to help protect and fight for his empire.  Special schools were set up where the powerful and loyal children would learn to become great soldiers to assist in the continued dominance of his empire.  Furthermore, scientists worked to create various drugs and pills that would increase the capabilities of any Hair Hunter, absorbing their goodness while replacing it with the evil within and making them achieve new, more demonic powers and capabilities while enhancing the skills and fists already possessed.  However, even with the power and the potential being prepared by the empire, there was one particular power locked away that would allow for the continued glories of his empire into the far future: an heir.  One boy, born with the evil aura of the empire, locked within his body from birth and hidden away within the Neo-Maruhage forces.  It would be this boy, Yononaka Namerō, who would assist for the continued dominance...or the eventual downfall, of the Maruhage.

But although the threat and power of the Neo-Maruhage Empire continued to persist in this new era, the rebellion of Bobobo-bo Bo-bobo and his Wiggin warriors remained.  Even in the face of more powerful enemies and threats, Bo-bobo's squad continued to take apart his warriors one after another.  However, Baldy-Bald, having faced Bo-bobo and his weird forces before, had a new plan prepared that would take care of all resistance once and for all.  A special purge began that, over three months, captured many of the former workers and rebels of the Maruhage Empire, upon which they would be executed when ready at the pleasure of the emperor.  Furthermore, the emperor would solidify his headquarters, fortifying with his most powerful warrior and experts in preparation for Bo-bobo's assault and the punishment of the rebels with the formation of Tokyo Maruhage 23 Wards, which transformed the city of Tokyo into his own ultimate battleground.  It is here that the final battle of Hajike rebels and Hair Hunters take place.

Neo-Maruhage Divisions
Like the first chapter of the original series, chapter one of Shinsetsu Bobobo-bo Bo-bobo shows the setup of the transformed Neo-Maruhage Empire.  While similar in many ways to the organization of the previous empire, slight changes have been made by Baldy-Bald the Third.

Emperor: As before, the emperor is the supreme leader of the empire, as ruled by Czar Baldy-Bald the Third.  However, this position is also held by the future potential emperor of the empire: successor Czar Baldy-Bald the Fifth: Yononaka Namerō.
Neo-Maruhage Three Great Kings (ネオマルハゲ三大王 Neo Maruhage Sandaiō): Although slightly similar to the Four Heavenly Kings of the original Maruhage Empire, the Three Great Kings are the closest guardians and protectors of Baldy-Bald the Third and the leaders of the Nine Experts.  These three conduct the most important and crucial actions within the empire, whether it is researching and developing the empire's weapons or delivering the justice against the empire.  Unlike the Four Heavenly Kings, all of them have immense loyalty towards the emperor and will do what is needed in order to defend him and the empire.  Initially the kings are composed of Babuu, Shiryūen Kamara, and Black Bo-bobo.  However, after Kamara's defeat, he is succeeded by the enigmatic Wiggin Hīragi while he coordinates a full Wiggin squad with his associate Jati defeating Babuu for the third position.
The Nine Experts (IXEX): The subordinates of the Three Great Kings, they are three bodyguards for each of the three kings totalling in the numbers of nine.  With the establishment of Tokyo Maruhage's 23 Wards, these bodyguards become guardian warriors protecting their respective king with their own power and abilities.
Blue Elite Corp: The guardians for Babuu, this squadron is made up of Hīragi, Jobus & Porusutoroi.  Particularly active after Baldy-Bald's declaration of war, they were notable for easily crushing Giga and Cyber City with their abilities.  Namerō was also placed in this squadron while his empiric powers slowly reawakened.  However, after an initial assault on Bo-bobo after Namerō's awakening and Hīragi's promotion, the squadron did not fight Bo-bobo in the 23 Wards.
Black Gambling Corp: The guardians for Shiryūen Kamara, made up of Princess Chinchiro, Usui & GURA-san the Punisher.  Particularly notorious for their deadly abilities, this squadron was particularly used for the punishment of empire traitors within the 23 Wards.  Bo-bobo's team ends up facing all three members of this squadron, taking apart one after another before fighting Kamara himself.
White Masked Gang of Deadly Illusions: Three white-cloaked warriors under the control of Black Bo-bobo.  Although members of the Nine Experts and potential opponents for Bo-bobo's team, the team never faced the rebels and ended up disrobing after Baldy-Bald is finally defeated, their true identities never revealed.

Fictional empires
Bobobo-bo Bo-bobo